Don Bosco Academy, Patna is a co-educational institution located in the Digha area of Patna, India, established in 1973. It is affiliated to the Council for the Indian School Certificate Examinations, New Delhi – ISC/ICSE school (till 12th standard). It was founded by Alfred de Rozario and his wife Dorothy de Rozario. It is now managed by the Don Bosco Anglo-Indian Educational Society.
The current principal of the school is Mrs. Mary Alphonsa.

History

Don Bosco Academy, Patna was founded in the year 1973 by Alfred de Rozario and Dorothy de Rozario. In 1972 they set up a small hostel for school going children in the name and style of Don Bosco Hostel. In 1973 they ventured to open an Anglo-Indian Co-educational school - Don Bosco Academy. Initially it served as a feeder school for the other but few, established schools of the area.

In 1981 they handed over the control and management of the school to the Don Bosco Anglo-Indian Educational Society, a registered body. In 1982 Mr. Rozario joined as Principal of Don Bosco Academy. In 1983 the school obtained affiliation to the Council for the Indian School Certificate Examinations, New Delhi.

Location

The main school campus is located in Digha locality of Patna which caters to Std 5 to 12. A junior campus is located in Patliputra locality of Patna which caters to students up to Std 4.

School building and facilities

The school building is four-storied, with a playing field and an open-air stage. The school has science laboratories for Physics, Chemistry and Biology, 2 multi-purpose halls and over 30 State of the Art Smart Class-rooms & other spacious classrooms, three computer laboratories and a library. It has school buses for transporting students. DBA organises various intra−school and inter−school football and cricket tournaments every year.

Curriculum

The school is affiliated to the Council for the Indian School Certificate Examinations, New Delhi since July 1983 to conduct the Indian Certificate of Secondary Education Examination (ICSE-Year-10) and from 1999 to conduct the Indian School Certificate (Year-12 ) examination (ISC-12).

Teachers
The teaching staff of the school is good. They teach nicely. They are among the best teaching faculty in India.

𝚂𝚌𝚑𝚘𝚘𝚕 𝚂𝚘𝚗𝚐 
𝓣𝓱𝓮 𝓢𝓬𝓱𝓸𝓸𝓵 𝓢𝓸𝓷𝓰 𝓸𝓯 𝓓𝓸𝓷 𝓑𝓸𝓼𝓬𝓸 𝓐𝓬𝓪𝓭𝓮𝓶𝔂 𝓲𝓼 " 𝓑𝓸𝔂𝓼 𝓪𝓷𝓭 𝓰𝓲𝓻𝓵𝓼 𝓸𝓯 𝓓𝓸𝓷 𝓑𝓸𝓼𝓬𝓸, 𝓰𝓪𝓽𝓱𝓮𝓻𝓮𝓭 𝓪𝓽 𝓽𝓱𝓲𝓼 𝓱𝓸𝓾𝓻 " .

Subjects
  English
  Hindi
  Sanskrit
  Mathematics
  Science (Physics, Chemistry, Biology)
  Value Education/Moral Science
  History, Geography, Civics
  Computer Studies/Science/Applications
  Economics/Economic Applications
  Commerce/Commercial Studies/Applications
  Business Studies
  Accounts
  Yoga
  Socially Useful and Productive Work -(SUPW)
  Environmental Education/Science
Music/Singing/Art&Craft

References

External links 
 
  (Ranchi campus)

Schools in Patna
Christian schools in Bihar
High schools and secondary schools in Bihar
Educational institutions established in 1973
1973 establishments in Bihar